Many of the world records in swimming were established by swimmers wearing bodysuits or suits made of polyurethane or other non-textile materials allowed in the race pool from February 2008 until December 2009. These suits seemed to improve the performance for top athletes, especially those with larger physiques. The times shown below are the fastest in the world set by swimmers wearing suits made of textile materials.

Long course

Men

Women

Mixed relay
All mixed relays textile best times are also world records.

Short course

Men

Women

Mixed relay
All mixed relays textile best times are also world records.

References

External links
 FINA swimming world records

World
Swimming